Munford may refer to:

Places in the United States
 Munford, Alabama, a town
 Munford, Tennessee, a city
 Munford, Virginia, an unincorporated community

People
 Beverley B. Munford (1856–1910), American lawyer, politician, social reformer, speaker and author
 Don Munford (born 1954), American politician
 Harvey Munford (born 1940), American politician
 Marc Munford (born 1965), American former football player
 Mary-Cooke Branch Munford (1865–1938), American activist for women's rights, civil rights, women's suffrage and education
 Robert Munford (1925–1991), American artist and educator
 Robyn Munford, New Zealand social work researcher and professor
 Thayer Munford (born 1999), American football player
 Thomas T. Munford (1831–1918), Confederate acting brigadier general in the Civil War
 Xavier Munford (born 1992), American basketball player for Hapoel Tel Aviv of the Israeli Basketball Premier League

Other uses
 Battle of Munford, a Civil War battle at Munford, Alabama
 Munford High School, Munford, Tennessee